Love Killer may refer to:

"Love Killer" (The Killer Barbies song)
"Love Killer", song by Cheryl Cole from A Million Lights
"Love Killer", song by Blutengel from Demon Kiss
The Love Killers, a 1989 republishing of Jackie Collins novel Lovehead

See also
Lovekiller (disambiguation)
Killer Love